Jimmy Arthur Raye III (born November 24, 1968) is an American football former professional wide receiver and current team executive in the National Football League (NFL).

Early years
Raye is the son of Jimmy Raye II, who was the offensive coordinator for seven different NFL teams, most recently the San Francisco 49ers. He attended Irvine High School in Irvine, California during his high school years.

College career
A wide receiver for the Aztecs of San Diego State University (SDSU) from 1986 to 1990, Raye earned a bachelor's degree in public administration. He left SDSU tied for eighth on the school's all-time receiving list with 111 catches.

National Football League career
Raye's National Football League career began when he signed a free agent contract with the Los Angeles Rams in 1991. He ended up playing in the final two games of the season.

He was the offensive quality control coach for the Kansas City Chiefs in 1995. He joined the San Diego Chargers as a scout from 1996–1999, and served as the team's director of college scouting from 2000–2007. He was the Chargers' director of player personnel from 2008–2012.

In 2012, Chicago Bears general manager Jerry Angelo was fired, and Raye was one of four candidates for the job.

In 2013, Raye was hired as VP of Football Operations for the Indianapolis Colts, and held the post from 2013–2016.

In 2017, he was hired as VP of player personnel/assistant general manager for the Houston Texans.

In 2018, Raye was hired as Senior Personnel Executive for the Detroit Lions. On March 5, 2021, Raye parted ways with the Lions.

References

External links
 Databasefootball.com playerpage RAYEJIM02
 Colts press release

1968 births
Living people
American football wide receivers
Los Angeles Rams players
San Diego State Aztecs football players
Sportspeople from Fayetteville, North Carolina
Sportspeople from Irvine, California
African-American players of American football
San Diego Chargers scouts
Houston Texans executives
Detroit Lions executives
Indianapolis Colts executives
San Diego Chargers executives
Kansas City Chiefs coaches
21st-century African-American people
20th-century African-American sportspeople